Tetrapleura tetraptera is a species of flowering plant in the family Fabaceae native to Western Africa and Central Africa. The plant is called prekese (or, more correctly, prɛkɛsɛ aka soup perfume) in the Twi language of Ghana. It is also called uhio (uhiokrihio) in the Igbo language of Nigeria.

The tree has many uses. Its sweet fragrance is valued, its fruit is used to spice dishes, such as Banga soup, and its bark is used for supposed medicinal purposes. The major constituents are tannins, flavonoids and starch. It is mostly used to prepare palm nut soup and other types of soups called light soup because of its aroma.

References

Mimosoids
Flora of Ghana
Plants used in traditional African medicine